Cullen Bay is a man-made housing and marina development in located in the Darwin suburb of Larrakeyah that was created in the early 1990s. It has a number of popular bars and restaurants.

History
It was created in the early 1990s by enclosing Kahlin Bay, between Myilly Point and Larrakeyah.

Present day

The ferry for Mandorah leave from the jetty beside the lock.

References

External links

Bays of the Northern Territory
Darwin, Northern Territory